Places I Never Meant to Be is a book edited by Judy Blume and first published in 1999. The book is a collection of short stories written by authors who have been censored or banned in some form in the United States. Sales went to benefit the National Coalition Against Censorship.

Authors
The following authors contributed the stories:
Norma Fox Mazer, "Meeting the Mugger"
Julius Lester, "Spear"
Rachel Vail, "Going Sentimental"
Katherine Paterson, "The Red Dragonfly"
Jacqueline Woodson, "July Saturday"
Harry Mazer, "You Come, Too, A-Ron"
Walter Dean Myers, "The Beast Is in the Labyrinth"
Susan Beth Pfeffer, "Ashes"
David Klass, "Baseball Camp"
Paul Zindel, "Love and Centipedes"
Chris Lynch, "Lie, No Lie"
Norma Klein, "Something Which is Non-Existent"

External links
 NCAC National Coalition Against Censorship website
 Book excerpt: Introduction by Judy Blume

1999 anthologies
Fiction anthologies
Books by Judy Blume
Simon & Schuster books
American anthologies